The Abijah Thompson House is a historic house in Winchester, Massachusetts.  The 1.5-story wood-frame house was built sometime between 1835 and 1850, and is a fine local example of Gothic Revival style.  Its first documented owner, Abijah Thompson, was the first president of the Winchester Historical Society.  The house bears resemblance to other Gothic Revival cottages in Wellesley and Newton, particularly because of the central polygonal bay, which is flanked by steeply pitched gables.  It is also somewhat similar to the Moore House at 85 Walnut Street.

The house was added to the National Register of Historic Places in 1989.

See also
National Register of Historic Places listings in Winchester, Massachusetts

References

Houses on the National Register of Historic Places in Winchester, Massachusetts
Houses in Winchester, Massachusetts